Thibaut Garcia (born 26 May 1994, Toulouse, France) is a French classical guitarist.

Early life and education 
Garcia, whose Spanish origins have influenced his style, began playing the guitar at the age of seven.

Awards
In 2015 Garcia was awarded the 1st prize of the Guitar Foundation of America 2015.

Garcia has performed for the French TV show la boîte à musique on France 2 (French Television), invited by the musician Jean-François Zygel and performed on France Musique in December 2015 in Gaëlle Le Gallic’s program. He received the Prix Filleul 2015 of the Académie Charles Cros.

Discography 
 Demain dès l’aube (Contrastes Records / Naxos, 2014)
 Leyendas (Erato / Warner Classics, 2016)
 "Bach Inspirations" (Erato / Warner Classics, 2018)
 Aranjuez (Erato / Warner Classics, 2020)
 À sa guitare (with Philippe Jaroussky; Erato / Warner Classics, 2021)

References

External links 
 

French classical guitarists
French male guitarists
Musicians from Toulouse
1994 births
Living people
21st-century guitarists
21st-century French male musicians
Erato Records artists